Leek is a surname. In English, it is an alternative spelling of Leake. In Dutch, it is a topographical name for someone living near a water named leek, from the word leek meaning "border water". Notable people with the surname include:

 Andy Leek (born 1958), English musician
 Gene Leek (born 1936), American former baseball player
 Geoff Leek (1932–2008), Australian rules footballer
 John de Leche or de Leek, Archbishop of Dublin (1311-1311)
 Ken Leek (1935–2007), Welsh footballer
 Miranda Leek (born 1993), American archer
 Peter Leek (born 1988), Australian Paralympic swimmer
 Ralph Leek, American football player
 Stephen Leek (born 1959), Australian composer, conductor, educator and publisher
 Sybil Leek (1917–1982), English witch, astrologer and psychic

See also
 Leak (surname)

References